The sixth and final season of the NBC American supernatural drama series Grimm was announced on April 18, 2016. It premiered on January 6 and concluded on March 31, 2017. The season consisted of 13 episodes. The series, created by David Greenwalt, Jim Kouf and Stephen Carpenter, is produced by NBC, GK Productions, Hazy Mills Productions, and Universal Television. The main plot follows a descendant of the Grimm line, Nick Burkhardt, as he deals with being a cop, and trying not to expose his secret as a Grimm.

Cast and characters

Main
 David Giuntoli as Nick Burkhardt
 Russell Hornsby as Hank Griffin
 Silas Weir Mitchell as Monroe
 Elizabeth Tulloch as Eve
 Reggie Lee as Sergeant Drew Wu
 Sasha Roiz as Captain Sean Renard
 Bree Turner as Rosalee Calvert
 Claire Coffee as Adalind Schade

Recurring 
 Chris McKenna as Lt. Grossante
Jacqueline Toboni as Theresa "Trubel" Rubel
Danny Bruno as Bud Wurstner
Hannah R. Loyd as Diana
Damien Puckler as Martin Meisner

Guest stars
Alla Korot as Dasha Karpushin
Kevin Joy as Adult Kelly Burkhardt
Nicole Steinwedell as Adult Diana
Wil Traval as Zerstorer
Douglas Trait as Skull Zerstorer

Special guest stars
Kate Burton as Marie Kessler
Mary Elizabeth Mastrantonio as Kelly Burkhardt

Production 
On December 31, 2016, it was revealed that the sixth season would consist of at least 13 episodes, unlike previous seasons.

Casting 
On July 27, 2016, Chris McKenna was cast as Lt. Grossante, a formidable and driven "military-type" cop.

Episodes

Ratings
Time slot for Grimm in Season 6 was Fridays at 8:00 P.M. (EST).

References 

2017 American television seasons
Season 6